The Nouvelle théologie (French for new theology) is a school of thought in Catholic theology that arose in the mid-20th century, most notably among certain circles of French and German theologians. 

Theologians who are nowadays identified as influential in of the nouvelle théologie sought "a spiritual and intellectual communion with Christianity in its most vital moments as transmitted to us in its classic texts, a communion which would nourish, invigorate, and rejuvenate twentieth-century Catholicism." To accomplish this, they advocated a far broader "return to the sources" of the Christian faith: namely, Scripture and the writings of the Church Fathers. They also developed a renewed interest in particulars of biblical exegesis, typology, art, literature, and mysticism. This methodological approach is known by its French name, ressourcement ("return to the sources"). The name "new theology" was a derisive label given by its opponents.

Origins
The roots of a questioning of the dominance of neo-scholasticism may be traced to theologians working from the 1920s onwards. While some French Jesuit studies conducted in exile at Ore Place, Hastings, England, in the years 1906–1926 have been seen by some as forerunners of the nouvelle théologie, the nouvelle théologie movement itself is generally associated with the period between 1935 and 1960. In its early stages (i.e. the 1930s and early 1940s) the movement is also particularly associated with the French language, in part contrast with the Latin used in seminary teaching at the time.

Ideas
Although lumped together as a set by their opponents, the theologians associated with the nouvelle théologie had a great range of interests, views, and methodologies, and were not themselves a co-ordinated group. In later writing, Yves Congar, Henri de Lubac and Henri Bouillard all denied that the nouvelle théologie was anything but a construct of its opponents. However, subsequent studies of the movement have suggested that there did exist a set of shared characteristics among writers of the nouvelle théologie. These include:
A tendency to ascribe a worthy place to history within the theological endeavour.
The appeal of a positive theology.
A critical attitude towards neo-scholasticism.

Criticism
The developing movement received criticisms in the late 1940s and 1950s. A first attack was made by the influential Dominican theologian Reginald Garrigou-Lagrange  in a polemical 1946 article in the journal Angelicum. While the theologians of the movement generally preferred to call their movement a ressourcement, based on their return to original patristic thought, Garrigou-Lagrange claimed that they did not "return to the sources" but deviated from the long-standing theological tradition of the Catholic Church, thus creating a "new theology" all their own which, he claimed, was essentially Modernism in disguise. Although another writer, Pietro Parente, had used the term "teologia nuova" in 1942, it was from Garrigou-Lagrange's article that the label entered into widespread use.

See also 
 Ad fontes, a Latin phrase meaning "to the sources" used during by Renaissance humanism

Notes

References

Sources

Further reading

 
 
 
 
 
 
 

Christian theological movements
Catholic theology and doctrine
Allegations